Board Branch is a stream in Shelby County in the U.S. state of Missouri. It is a tributary of Tiger Fork.

Board Branch was so named for the board trees near its course which supplied sawmills.

See also
List of rivers of Missouri

References

Rivers of Shelby County, Missouri
Rivers of Missouri